Phera (  "Retern") is a 2008 Bengali film Directed by  Partha Sarathi Jowardar.

References

External links
 www.gomolo.in
www.telegraphindia.com preview

2008 films
Bengali-language Indian films
2000s Bengali-language films